The Order of Saints Maurice and Lazarus (abbreviated OSSML) is a Roman Catholic dynastic order of knighthood bestowed by the royal House of Savoy.  It is the second-oldest order of knighthood in the world, tracing its lineage to AD 1098, and it is one of the rare orders of knighthood recognized by papal bull, in this case by Pope Gregory XIII.  In that bull, Pope Gregory XIII bestowed upon Emmanuel Philibert, Duke of Savoy and his Savoy successors, the right to confer this knighthood in perpetuity. The Grand Master is, Vittorio Emanuele, Prince of Naples, also known as the Duke of Savoy, the eldest son of the last King of Italy, Umberto II of Italy. However Vittorio Emanuele's cousin once removed Prince Aimone, Duke of Aosta claims to be grand master as his father claimed to be head of the house of Savoy. 

The order was formerly awarded by the Kingdom of Italy (1861–1946) with the heads of the House of Savoy as the Kings of Italy. Originally a chivalric order of noble nature, it was restricted to subjects of noble families with proofs of at least eight noble great-grandparents. The order's military and noble nature was and is still combined with a Roman Catholic character.

After the abolition of the monarchy and the foundation of the Italian Republic in 1946, the legacy of the order is maintained by the pretenders of the House of Savoy and the Italian throne in exile.

The order is estimated to include about 2,000 members around the world, with about 200 in the United States.  The Order also has roster consultative status with the United Nations, as part of the U.N.'s ECOSOC.

History 

Both crosses from its two forerunners still exist in the insignia of their subsequent successor, today's Order of Saints Maurice and Lazarus, founded by amalgation in 1572.

Order of Saint Lazarus (1119) 

The Order of Saint Lazarus, founded c. 1119, can be traced to the establishment around 1100, of a hospital for leprosy in Jerusalem, Kingdom of Jerusalem, by a group of crusaders who called themselves "Brothers of Saint Lazarus". Those knights protected Christian pilgrims to the Holy Land.  From its inception, the order was concerned with the relief of leprosy and other illnesses, and many of its members were lepers who had been knights in other orders. It became rich, its practices dubious, and its funds eventually abused. With the fall of Acre in 1291, the Knights of Saint Lazarus emigrated from the Holy Land and Egypt and settled in France and, in 1311, in Naples. In the 16th century, the order declined in credibility and wealth. With papal support, the Duke of Savoy became Grand Master in 1572. During medieval times, the Order of Saint Lazarus maintained a number of hospitals, including an institution in the Italian city of Capua.

Order of Saint Maurice (1434) 

The Order of Saint Maurice was established in 1434 by Amedeo VIII of Savoy, during his stay in the Ripaglia hermitage near Thonon, named after Saint Maurice of the Theban Legion. From its beginning, it was a military order. The order declined, but in 1572 was reestablished by Pope Pius V at the instigation of the then-Duke of Savoy.

Order of Saints Maurice and Lazarus (1572) 

In 1572, Pope Gregory XIII united the Order of Saint Lazarus in perpetuity with the Crown of Savoy. Emmanuel Philibert, Duke of Savoy, merged it with the Savoyan Order of Saint Maurice, and thenceforth the title of Grand Master of the Order of Saints Maurice and Lazarus was hereditary in that house. The pope gave him authority over the vacant commanderies everywhere, except in the states of the King of Spain, which included the greater part of Italy. In England and Germany, these commanderies were suppressed by the Protestant reformation.

The new organization was charged to defend the Holy See and Italian shores, as well as continue to assist the sick. The war galleys of the order fought against the Ottoman Empire and the Barbary pirates with the United States Marine Corps. When leprosy again broke out, the order founded a hospital in Aosta in 1773.

Kingdom Italy (1861–1946) 

With the Italian unification (1860-1871), the order became a de facto Italian state order for military and civilian merits, consisting of five classes: Knight Grand Cross, Knight Grand Officer, Knight Commander, Knight Officer and Knight.

The formerly related Maurician medal for Military Merit of fifty years, established in 1839, was one of the few medals not suppressed by the Italian republic, becoming the Maurician medal of Merit for 50 years military career in 1954.

Brought back in favour by King Victor Emmanuel II of Italy, the order was sparingly conferred for distinguished service in military and civilian affairs as an exclusive award compared with the more common Order of the Crown of Italy.

Dynastic chivalric order bestowed in exile (1946-) 
After Italy became a republic in 1946, the order was effectively replaced by the government's Order of Merit of the Italian Republic. Since 1951 it has not been officially recognized by the Italian republic, but remains recognized by most other jurisdictions, particularly those with extant royal houses.

Organisation 

The House of Savoy in exile continues to bestow the order on recipients eminent in the public service, science, art, letters, trade, and charitable works. While the continued use of those decorations conferred prior to 1951 is permitted in Italy, the crowns on the ribbons issued before 1946 must be substituted for as many five pointed stars on military uniforms. Eventually, it became a requirement for a person to have already received the Order of Saints Maurice and Lazarus before receiving the Supreme Order of the Most Holy Annunciation.

The generally accepted Grand Master of the order is Vittorio Emanuele, Prince of Naples, the current head of the House of Savoy. However, some of Vittorio Emanule's policies as Grand Master have generated controversy.

In 2006, Vittorio Emanuele's third cousin, Prince Amedeo, Duke of Aosta (b. 1943), declared himself head of the Savoy dynasty and thus Sovereign de jure, but no one has recognized that claim.

Grades 
According to the Statutes, the Order is divided into five classes for the Knights (male members):
Knight Grand Cordon, who wear a sash on the right shoulder to the left hip and the badge as well as star are worn on the left side;
Grand Officer, who wear a necklet plus the star on the left chest;
Commander, who wear a necklet;
Officer, who wear a medal in Gold on the left side of the chest;
Knight, who wear a smaller Medal in Silver on the left side of the chest.

For female members the Order is divided into in three classes:
Dame Grand Cordon, wearing a sash similar to that of their male counterparts
Dame Commander, who wear on a necklet. During daydress: wear a bow formed necklet worn on the left side of the chest. During evening wear: bow formed necklet worn on the left side of the chest)
Dame, who wear a smaller necklet; During daydress and evening wear: bow formed medal worn on the left side of the chest

Special Class of the Order:
Knight Grand Cordon, Special Class, For the Grand Master of the Order; who wear a sash on the right shoulder to the left hip, the badge as well as star which is worn on the left side of the stomach are in Brilliants

Insignia 

The badge of the order is in gilt, consists of a white-enameled cross bottony of the Order of Saint Maurice, with a green-enameled Maltese Cross, the Cross of the Order of Saint Lazarus, placed in saltire between the arms of the cross botonny. The badge of each class except that of Knight and Dame is topped by a gilt crown.
The star of the Order is a silver faceted star, with eight points for Grand Cross and four points for Grand Officer, and with the badge (minus the crown) superimposed upon it.
The breast cross for the Commander "jus patronato" class is identical to the badge, minus the crown.
The ribbon of the Order is apple green, with slight variations for the several classes:

List of Grand Masters 
 Emmanuel Philibert, Duke of Savoy (1572-1580) 
 Charles Emmanuel I, Duke of Savoy (1580-1630)
 Victor Amadeus I, Duke of Savoy (1630-1637) 
 Francis Hyacinth, Duke of Savoy (1637-1638) 
 Charles Emmanuel II, Duke of Savoy (1638-1675) 
 Victor Amadeus II of Sardinia (1675-1731) 
 Charles Emmanuel III of Sardinia (1732-1773) 
 Victor Amadeus III of Sardinia (1773-1796)
 Charles Emmanuel IV of Sardinia (1796-1802) 
 Victor Emmanuel I of Sardinia (1802-1824) 
 Charles Felix of Sardinia (1824-1831) 
 Charles Albert of Sardinia (1831-1849) 
 Victor Emmanuel II of Italy (1849-1878) 
 Umberto I of Italy (1878-1900) 
 Victor Emmanuel III of Italy (1900-1946) 
 Umberto II of Italy (1946-1983) 
 Vittorio Emanuele, Prince of Naples (1983-) (contested by Prince Aimone, Duke of Aosta 2021-)

The council 
The council is responsible for running the order, the order focuses mainly on charitable acts.

 Chairman: Emanuele Filiberto of Savoy, Prince of Venice
 Vice Chairman: Antonio d’Amelio
 Grand Chancellor: Theo Niederhauser
 Grand Treasurer: Nicolas Gagnebin
 Grand Prior: Monsignor Paolo de Nicolò
 Grand Master of Ceremonies: Prof. Alberto Bochicchio
 HSH Mariano Hugo Windisch Graetz
 HSH Prince Don Alessandro Jacopo Boncompagni Ludovisi Altemps
 Duke Giancarlo Melzi d’Eril dei Duchi di Lodi
 Count Carlo Buffa dei Conti di Perrero – Honorary Member

The Junta 
The Junta is responsible for voting in new Knight or Dame to the dynastic order on behalf of the grand master, Vittorio Emanuele, Prince of Naples. There are always five members of the Junta to ensure that there is never an equal count in votes for and against a new possible new Knight or Dame.

 HSH Don Alessandro Jacopo Boncompagni Ludovisi Altemps – President
 Marquess Paolo Thaon di Revel Vandini – Secretary
 Baron Enrico Sanjust dei Baroni di Teulada
 Gualtiero Ventura
 Federico Pizzi

Recipients in selection

Monarchs 
 Emperor Franz Joseph I of Austria
 Emperor Wilhelm II of the German Empire
 Emperor Nicholas II of Russia
 Emperor Haile Selassie of Ethiopia
 King Zog I of Albania
 King George V of the United Kingdom
 Emperor Mozaffar ad-Din Shah Qajar of Persia
 Prince and Grand Master Andrew Bertie of the Sovereign Military Order of Malta
 Maharaja Jagatjit Singh
 Maharaja Juddha Shumsher Jang Bahadur Rana
 Mihailo Obrenović of Serbia
Abbas I of Egypt

Military 
 General of the Armies John Pershing
 General of the Army George Marshall
 Field Marshal Walther von Brauchitsch
 Field Marshal Francisco Solano López
 General Matthew Bunker Ridgway
 General François d'Astier de La Vigerie
 General Tasker H. Bliss
 General Mark W. Clark
 General Ira C. Eaker
 General Peyton C. March
 Admiral Ernesto Burzagli
 Surgeon Rear-Admiral Arthur Skey
 Major General Ulysses S. Grant III
 Major General Mason Patrick
 Rear Admiral Richard Byrd
 Brigadier General Billy Mitchell
 Naval Captain Emilio Faà di Bruno
 Flight Commander Douglas Harries
 SS-Obergruppenführer Hans Lammers
 Field Marshal Plaek Phibunsongkhram
 Brigadier General Evan M. Johnson
 Brigadier General Walter McCaw
 Charles R. Train

Politics 
 Diplomat Isaac Artom
 Tomáš Garrigue Masaryk, 1921
 Enrico d’Arienzo, Prefect of Caltanisetta 1925
 Henri Jaspar
 Charles de Broqueville
 Charles Rogier
 Baron Edmond de Sélys Longchamps
 President Porfirio Díaz
Dr Hans Frank, 26.9.1936
 Minister of foreign affairs Giustino Fortunato
 Member of Parliament Cristiana Muscardini
 Diplomat Jose Maria Quijano Wallis
 Luigi, Count Cibrario
 Baron Oswald von Richthofen, State Secretary for Foreign Affairs of the German Empire - August 1902 - during the visit to Germany of King Victor Emmanuel III of Italy
 President of the 1904 Louisiana Purchase Exposition and Former St. Louis Mayor David R. Francis
 Mayor Rudolph Giuliani of New York City (2001) Cavaliere di Gran Croce (Motu Proprio)
 Aldo Oviglio, Minister of Justice (1922–1925)
 James Charles Risk of New York City, Cavaliere di Gran Croce, originally inducted by the last reigning King of Italy, Umberto II of Italy
Benito Mussolini, Prime Minister of Italy and Duce of Fascism

Culture 
 Architect Carlo Rainaldi

Priests 
 Pietro Tacchi Venturi
 Agostino Rivarola
 Tommaso Reggio
 Timothy M. Dolan
 Désiré-Félicien-François-Joseph Mercier
 Andrea Carlo Ferrari

Sciences 
 Charles Combes
 Giovanni Miani, explorer
 Giuseppe Peano
 Joseph Vallot

Philanthropy 
 Thomas Hanbury
 J. P. Morgan

Recipients (amongst others) 

 Emanuele Filiberto of Savoy, Prince of Venice, Knight Grand Cross
 Clotilde Courau, Princess of Venice
 Princess Vittoria of Savoy, Princess of Carignano Marchioness of Ivrea
 Princess Luisa of Savoy
 Marina Doria, Princess of Naples and Duchess of Savoy
 Princess Maria Pia of Bourbon-Parma
 Princess Maria Gabriella of Savoy
 Princess Maria Beatrice of Savoy
 Prince Dimitri of Yugoslavia
 Prince Michael of Yugoslavia
 Prince Sergius of Yugoslavia
 Princess Helen of Yugoslavia
 Nicholas, Crown Prince of Montenegro
 Prince Carlo, Duke of Castro
 Mariano Hugo, Prince of Windisch-Graetz Knight Grand Cross
 Prince Don Alessandro Jacopo Boncompagni Ludovisi Altemps Knight Grand Cross
 Marquess Paolo Thaon di Revel Vandini Knight Grand Cross
 Baron Enrico Sanjust dei Baroni di Teulada Knight Grand Cross
 Prof. Alberto Bochicchio Knight Grand Cross
 Count Carlo Buffa dei Conti di Perrero  Knight Grand Cross
 Count Giuseppe Rizzani Knight Grand Cross
 Rudy Giuliani Knight Grand Cross
 Giovanni Cheli Knight Grand Cross
 Duke Giancarlo Melzi d'Eril  Knight Grand Cross
 Count Andrea Boezio Bertinotti Alliata
 Andrea Rivoira  Knight Grand Cross
 Antonio d’Amelio Knight Grand Cross
 Franca Sciaraffia Dame Grand Cross
 Nicolas Gagnebin Knight Grand Cross
 Theo Niederhauser Knight Grand Cross
 Monsignor Paolo de Nicolò Knight Grand Cross
 Alberto Di Maria Knight Grand Officer
 Dame Zina Losapio
 Alessandro Santini
 Alberico Guerzoni
 Giovanni Cheli
 Rudy Giuliani

See also 

List of Italian orders of knighthood
Dynastic order of knighthood
Order of Merit of the Italian Republic

References

Notes

External links 

 Dynastic Orders of the Royal House of Savoy
 American Delegation of Savoy Orders
 The Order of Saints Maurice and Lazarus (by Louis Mendola)

 
Saints Maurice and Lazarus, Order of
History of Catholicism in Italy